A list of films made in the Caribbean islands by island of origin (for films made in Cuba, see List of Cuban films):

Antigua and Barbuda

Diablesse (2005)
Hooked (2009)
The Island (1980)
No Seed (2002)
Once in an Island (2009)
Redemption of Paradise (2010)
The Skin (2011)
The Sweetest Mango (2001)
Working Girl (2011)
The West Indian (2020)

Aruba
Sabine (1982)
Dera Gai (1990)
E Secreto (2002)
Heb het Lief (2010)
10 Ave Maria (2011)
Awa Brak (2012)
Siblings (2012)
Abo So (2013)
Back of Beyond (2013)
The Package (2015)
Alto Vista (2015)
Siñami Stimabo (2016)
Libre de Pecado (2016)
E Yobida di Ayera (2016)
Natalia (2017)

Bahamas

Barbados

Island in the Sun starring Harry Belafonte (1957), American-British movie
 The Tamarind Seed (1974), American-British movie
 Black Snake (1973), American film directed by Russ Meyer 
Agatha Christie's Miss Marple - A Caribbean Mystery (1989) 
Chattel House (2004)
Guttaperc (1998)
The Shoe (2005)
Hit for Six (2006)
Tek Dem Out (2006)
Hush 1 (2008)
Hush 2 (2009)
Hush 3 (2011)
A Hand Full of Dirt (2011)
Chrissy (2012)
Payday (2013)
Keeping up with the Joneses: The Movie (2013)
Auntie (2013)
Vigilante - The Crossing (2015)
A Bajan Story (2016)
Barrow - Freedom Fighter (2016)
Trident - The Land We Call Home (2019)

Belize 

 Risking It All (2005)

 Tussen wind en water (1991)

Cuba

Curaçao
Ava and Gabriel, Felix de Rooy (1990)
Almacita Desolato, Felix de Rooy (1991)
Sensei Redenshon (2013)
Tula, Dolph van Stapele (2015)
Doubleplay, Ernest Dickerson (2017)
Vliegende Vissen verdrinken niet, Janga (2020)

Dominican Rep.

Grenada 
 Blinded (2006)

Guadeloupe

Guyana 

 Aggro seizeman (1975)

 Guyana 1838

 Rainbow Raani (2006)

 The Terror and the Time (1976)

Haiti

Jamaica

Martinique

Puerto Rico

Talento De Barrio (2006)

St. Vincent and the Grenadines 
The Bitter End (1992) by Maurice Horne Jr
Work Attitude (1997) by Maurice Horne Jr

Suriname 

 Operation Makonaima (1974)

 Paramaribo Papers (2002) (TV)

 Suriname (2011)

 Wan Lobi Tori: Lesley en Anne (2005) (TV)

 Wan Pipel (1976)

Trinidad and Tobago

Bim (1974)
The Caribbean Fox (1970)
Crossing Over (1989)
Diamonds from the Bantus (2002)
Flight of the Ibis (1996)
Girl from India (1982)
Innocent Adultery (1994)
Ivan the Terrible (2004)
A Loss of Innocence (2006)
Men of Gray (1990)
The Mystic Masseur (2001)
Never A Bright Day (2006)
Obeah (1987)
The Panman (1997)
The Right and the Wrong (1970)
SistaGod (2006)
Ghost of Hing King Estate (2009)
 What My Mother Told Me (1995)
God Loves the Fighter (2013)
 Between Friends (2013)
Escape From Babylon (2013)
 The Cutlass  (2017)
Little Boy Blue (2012)
Positive and Pregnant (2010)
Dark Tales From Paradise (2011)
Caribbean Skin African Identity (2011)
Buck the Man Spirit (2012)
I'm Santana: The Movie (2012)
Jab in the Dak (2013)
No Bois Man No Fraid (2013)
Ten Days of Muharram (2013)
A Child of Two Worlds (2013)
Home Again (2013)

References

External links
 Caribbean film at the Internet Movie Database

Films
Latin American cinema
Caribbean
Films